Kent Island High School (KIHS) is a public high school in Stevensville, Maryland, United States that first opened in 1998 to accommodate the growing population of Queen Anne's County.  The school takes its name from Kent Island, the location of the school (and the entire census-designated place of Stevensville).

The school is often seen as the successor to Stevensville High School, which closed in 1966, and was renovated and reopened as Stevensville Middle School.  The two schools have similar school colors and mascots (SHS's colors and mascot were blue and gold and the Pirates, compared to navy blue and silver and the Buccaneers of KIHS).  Between 1966 and 1998, residents of Kent Island attended Queen Anne's County High School.

Grades 10-12 are located at Kent Island High School, while 9th graders instead attend at an annex of the high school located at Matapeake Middle School.

Kent Island High School's sports teams are members of the Bayside conference and 2A East region in Maryland.

History

A fire broke out in a boys' bathroom at Kent Island High School on 26 September 2012. Nearly twenty-five volunteer firefighters, of the Kent Island Volunteer Fire Department, responded to the blaze; a police investigation valued damages to approximately $5,000.

Athletics 

Fall sports
 Cheerleading 
 Cross Country
 Dance
 Equestrian
 Field Hockey
 Football
 Golf
 Sailing
 Soccer (men's and women's)
 Volleyball 
Winter sports
 Basketball (men's and women's)
 Ice Hockey
 Indoor Track 
 Swimming 
 Wrestling 
Spring sports
 Baseball
 Corollary tennis
 Lacrosse (men's and women's)
 Sailing
 Softball
 Tennis 
 Track and Field

References

External links
Official website
aerial view of the school

Kent Island, Maryland
Public high schools in Maryland
Educational institutions established in 1998
Schools in Queen Anne's County, Maryland
1998 establishments in Maryland